Safelite Group, Inc. is an American provider of vehicle glass repair, replacement, and calibration services and insurance claims management company, based in Columbus, Ohio.

History 
Bud Glassman and Art Lankin started Safelite in a junkyard in Wichita, Kansas in 1947. 

Over time, the company evolved with Safelite Solutions, offering major insurance and fleet companies a third-party claims management service, and with Service AutoGlass, a national provider of wholesale vehicle glass products, installation tools, and materials. 

In 2007, Safelite was acquired by Belron, the world's largest vehicle glass company, providing service in over 32 countries. 

Thomas Feeney became the president and CEO in 2008. In late 2021, Renee Cachillo became the President and CEO as Thomas Feeney moved into a leadership role for Belron North America.

Sometime in the early 2010s, Safelite bought out Auto Glass Center, "Your Hometown Glass Company", which had locations in the midwest including Moline, Illinois, and Lincoln, Nebraska. The company is older than Safelite by a year. The acquisition of these locations by Safelite marks the first time they have had a presence in these areas. The original Auto Glass Center vehicles (now with a Safelite sticker on the driver and passenger doors) continued to be used for some time after until being replaced with original Safelite vehicles.

Description
It is a subsidiary of Belron, which is in turn owned by the Belgian D'Ieteren group. Belron operates similar companies in other countries, including Carglass in most of Europe, Autoglass in Britain and Ireland, Lebeau and Speedy Glass (Belron Canada Inc.) in Canada, O'Brien in Australia, and Smith & Smith in New Zealand.

Prior to being purchased by Belron, Safelite had been owned by J.P. Morgan & Co. a result of the company's 1997 bankruptcy filing.

The company is composed of three major business operations that include:
 automotive glass fulfillment services, operating under the trade name Safelite AutoGlass
 a wholesale business named Service AutoGlass
 a claims-management services provider named Safelite Solutions

Safelite AutoGlass operates in all 50 states.

See also

 Economy of Ohio
 Lists of companies

References

External links
Official Website

American companies established in 1947
Financial services companies established in 1947
Automotive companies established in 1947
Retail companies established in 1947
American subsidiaries of foreign companies
Auto parts suppliers of the United States
Automotive repair shops of the United States
Car windows
Companies based in the Columbus, Ohio metropolitan area
Companies that filed for Chapter 11 bankruptcy in 1997
Companies that filed for Chapter 11 bankruptcy in 2000
Manufacturing companies based in Ohio
Privately held companies based in Ohio
1947 establishments in Ohio

fr:Carglass